Gustave de Wailly, full name Gabriel Gustave de Wailly, (13 June 1804 – 27 April 1878 ) was a 19th-century French playwright and Latinist. Léon de Wailly was his brother.

Biography 
Brought up in a family of writers and academics, master of requests at the Conseil d’État (1830), he became inspector general of the former civil list and was known for his dramas.

He is buried at Père Lachaise Cemetery (20th division).

Works 
Some of his works were published under the pseudonym Mme Marie Senan.

1825: La Mort dans l'embarras, comédie nouvelle, in 3 acts and in verse, with Léon de Wailly
1826: Amour et intrigue, drama in 5 acts and in verss, imitated from Schiller
1826: Ivanhoé, opera in 3 acts, music by Gioacchino Rossini
1827: La Folle, ou Le testament d'un Anglaise, comedy
1827: Anglais et français, comedy in 1 act and in prose, with Jean-François-Alfred Bayard
1827: L'Oncle Philibert, comedy in 1 act and in prose, with Jean-François-Alfred Bayard
1830: Ma place et ma femme, comedy in 3 acts and in prose, with Jean-François-Alfred Bayard
1832: Madame du Chatelet, ou, Point de lendemain, comedy in 1 act, with François Ancelot
1838: L'Attente, drama in 1 act (by Mme Marie Senan)
1849: Elzéar Chalamel ou, Une assurance sur la vie, Comédie envaudeville in 3 acts, with Jules de Wailly
1850: Monck ou, Le sauveur de l'Angleterre, historical comedy in 5 acts
1852: Les Premières Armes de Blaveau, comédie en vaudeville in 1 act, with Jules de Wailly
1853: L'Oncle Tom, drama in 5 acts
1873: Œuvres de Alfred, Gustave et Jules de Wailly
1897: Promenade d'une famille anglaise à Paris monologue pour enfants, posthumous
1898: L'Oreiller qui pleure monologue, posthumous
 Louise, feuilleton 
 Les Parapluies, comedy in 1 act, with Gaston de Wailly
 Les Deux Devoirs, sea drama 1n 3 acts
 Les Deux Honneurs, military drama in 3 acts

Translations 
He realised many translations among others of Seneca the Younger and Virgil :

1836: Œuvres complètes de Sénèque le philosophe, with Alfred de Wailly.
1878: Odes d'Horace, with Étienne-Augustin De Wailly.

Honours 
 Chevalier of the Légion d'honneur (30 July 1832)

Bibliography 
 J.P.R Cuisin, Dictionnaire des gens de lettres vivants, 1826, (p. 264)
 Joseph Fr. Michaud, Louis Gabriel Michaud, Biographie universelle, 1843, vol.44, (p. 209)
 Joseph-Marie Quérard, Charles Louandre, La Littérature française contemporaine : XIX, 1857, (p. 591) 
 Gustave Vapereau, Dictionnaire universel des contemporains, 1865,(p. 1814) 
 Henri Van Hoof, Dictionnaire universel des traducteurs, 1993

References 

19th-century French dramatists and playwrights
French Latinists
Latin–French translators
Chevaliers of the Légion d'honneur
1804 births
Writers from Paris
1878 deaths
Burials at Père Lachaise Cemetery
19th-century French translators
Translators of Virgil